Neocalyptis is a genus of moths belonging to the subfamily Tortricinae of the family Tortricidae.

Species
Neocalyptis affinisana (Walker, 1863)
Neocalyptis angustilineata (Walsingham, 1900)
Neocalyptis aperta Diakonoff, 1952
Neocalyptis brinchangi Razowski, 2005
Neocalyptis chlansignum Razowski, 2006
Neocalyptis conicus Rose & Pooni, 2004
Neocalyptis felina (Meyrick, 1926)
Neocalyptis fortis Razowski, 2009
Neocalyptis insularis Diakonoff, 1948
Neocalyptis kimbaliana Razowski, 2005
Neocalyptis krzeminskii Razowski, 1989
Neocalyptis lacernata (Yasuda, 1975)
Neocalyptis ladakhana Razowski, 2006
Neocalyptis liratana (Christoph, 1881)
Neocalyptis magnilabis Razowski, 2009
Neocalyptis malaysiana Razowski, 2005
Neocalyptis molesta (Meyrick, 1910)
Neocalyptis monotoma Diakonoff, 1953
Neocalyptis morata Razowski, 1984
Neocalyptis nematodes (Meyrick, 1928)
Neocalyptis nexilis Razowski, 1984
Neocalyptis nuristana (Razowski, 1967)
Neocalyptis owadai (Kawabe, 1992)
Neocalyptis pigra (Meyrick, 1921)
Neocalyptis platytera (Diakonoff, 1983)
Neocalyptis rotundata Diakonoff, 1941
Neocalyptis sabahia Razowski, 2005
Neocalyptis sodaliana Kuznetzov, 1992
Neocalyptis taiwana Razowski, 2000
Neocalyptis telutanda Diakonoff, 1941
Neocalyptis tricensa (Meyrick, 1912)
Neocalyptis utarica Razowski, 2005

See also
List of Tortricidae genera

References

 , 1941, Treubia 18: 407.
 ,2005 World Catalogue of Insects, 5
 , 2000: Tortricidae (Lepidoptera) Collected in Taiwan, with Description of One New Genus and Eight New Species, and a Comparison with Some Regional Faunas. Zoological Studies 39 (4): 319–327. Full article: .
 , 2009, Tortricidae from Vietnam in the collection of the Berlin Museum. 7.Some additional data (Lepidoptera: Tortricidae), Polish Journal of Entomology 78 (1): 15–32. Full article: .

External links
tortricidae.com

Neocalyptis
Tortricidae genera